Otto de Grandson (c. 1238–1328), sometimes numbered Otto I to distinguish him from later members of his family with the same name, was the most prominent of the Savoyard knights in the service of King Edward I of England, to whom he was the closest personal friend and many of whose interests he shared.

Family

The son of Pierre, lord of Grandson near Lausanne and Agnès de Neuchâtel. He was the elder brother of William de Grandison, 1st Baron Grandison and Henri de Grandson, both of whom would join him in England. As would his cousins Pierre de Champvent and Guillaume de Champvent.

Service in England and Wales (1265–90)
The young Otto travelled to England probably in the company of Peter II of Savoy in 1252, certainly not later than 1265. There he entered the service of King Henry III and by 1267 was placed in the household of Prince Edward. In return for likely service for Prince Edward at the battles of Lewes and Evesham he was rewarded with property at Queenhithe in London. In 1268 both prince and servant were knighted and in 1271 the latter accompanied his lord on the Ninth Crusade, where he served at Acre that year. According to one source, it was Otto, not Eleanor of Castile, who sucked the poison from the wounded Edward after an attempted assassination. In 1272 Otto was appointed an executor in Acre.

Returning to England, he was a key household knight of King Edward I in his campaigns in Scotland and Wales, where he served as chief justiciar of Wales, based at Caernarfon Castle from 1284 to 1294. During the Welsh Wars of King Edward I Otto was very active diplomatically and militarily, beginning with the siege of Dolforwyn Castle in April 1277. On behalf of Edward, he concluded the Treaty of Aberconwy in November that brought the invasion of Wales in 1277 to an end. In 1278, he was appointed King's Lieutenant in the Duchy by Edward and sent to the Duchy of Gascony along with Robert Burnel. to reform the government. They appointed Jean I de Grailly as the new Seneschal and laid the foundations for the Treaty of Amiens sealed in 1279. He was also employed as a diplomat and gained contacts with most of the sovereigns of western Europe. During the second invasion of Wales in 1282–83 he narrowly escaped death at the battle of Moel-y-don before in April 1283 taking the town of Harlech at the head of 560 infantry. As a commander of the royal army that had begun the campaign from Anglesey he was amongst the first of Edward’s retinue to see the future castle sites at Caernarfon and Harlech.
In 1283 he was briefly in the employ of Edmund Crouchback, the king's younger brother, for diplomatic work. It was said that no one could do the king's will better, including the king himself. 

He was appointed governor of the Channel Islands and in 1290 appointed a bailiff for each of the bailiwicks of Guernsey and Jersey, giving them civil powers to administer the islands.

Crusading years (1290–99)
King Edward I of England sent Otto to Acre in the Holy Land in 1290 along with some English knights. At the time of the fall of Acre (1291), he was the master of the English knights in Palestine. At Acre he saved the life of fellow Savoyard Jean I de Grailly, with whom he had served Edward in Gascony earlier. As the city fell to the Muslims he commandeered Venetian ships filling them with fleeing troops and the wounded Jean I de Grailly, Otto was the last to join them on board.

After the fall of the city he fled to Cyprus a poor man, but went on a subsequent pilgrimage to Jerusalem. In 1298 or 1299, Otto, Jacques de Molay of the Templars, and Guillaume de Villaret of the Hospitallers campaigned in Cilicia in order to fight off an invasion by the Mamluks. In his La flor des estoires d'Orient, the Armenian monk Hayton of Corycus mentions his activity on the mainland in Cilicia in 1298–1299: "Otto de Grandison and the Masters of the Temple and of the Hospitallers as well as their convents, who were at that time [1298 or 1299] in these regions [Cilician Armenia] . . .".

Back in England (1299–1307)
He was summoned to Parliament in 1299, which resulted in him becoming Baron Grandison. This title became extinct on his death.

Ireland and the Continent (1307–28)
In 1307, on Edward's death, Otto left England permanently. He remained in the service of the crown for a while longer, however, for until 1317 he represented England at the Papal Curia. He also continued to have interests in England, for he was in correspondence with John Langton and Walter Reynolds and in 1277 he had been granted the Channel Islands as a lordship for life, along with lands in England and Ireland, in reward for his service. In 1323 he visited the Channel Islands with a bodyguard of twenty crossbowmen, which he had been ruling (inefficiently) as an absentee. He also made religious foundations from his great wealth, probably accumulated as reward for his work, and for these he obtained privileges and priories from the popes through his embassies. He was a benefactor of Vale Royal, an Edwardian foundation, and of Saint Jean de Grandson, where he increased the number of monks after 1288. He founded a Franciscan friary in 1289 and a Carthusian monastery at La Lance in 1317.

At the end of his life he returned to Grandson, which he had inherited from his father and to which he had made recurrent visits throughout his adult life. He never married and was succeeded by his nephew. He had advanced many of his relatives through his embassies, especially in the church. Three of his relatives served as Bishops of Lausanne and another nephew, John Grandisson, succeeded to the Diocese of Exeter. In the spring of 1328, the ninety-year-old knight set out tor one last trip to Rome. Close to Aigle, he was taken ill. On 5 April 1328, he died.

His tomb was ordered by the Pope to be placed in the cathedral of Lausanne.

Notes

References

Bibliography

 Clifford, Esther. R. A Knight of Great Renown: The Life and Times of Otto de Grandson. 1961.
 Dean, Robert J. "Castles in Distant Lands: The Life and Times of Othon de Grandson". 2009.
 Demurger, Alain. Jacques de Molay. Payot, 2007.
 Ghazarian, Jacob G. Who was Otto de Grandison?
 Hicks, Michael A. "Sir Otto Grandisson." Who's Who in Late Medieval England, 1272–1485. 1st ed. Geoffrey Treasure, series editor. Stackpole Books, 1991. pp. 10–11. .
 Kingsford, Charles, Lethbridge. "Sir Otho de Grandison 1238?–1328." Transactions of the Royal Historical Society, 3rd Ser., Vol. 3. (1909), pp. 125–195.
 Labarge, Margaret Wade. Gascony, England's First Colony 1204–1453. London: Hamish Hamilton, 1980.
 Maddicott J. R. "Grandson , Sir Otto de (c.1238–1328)", Oxford Dictionary of National Biography. Oxford University Press, 2004 [online 2005]. Accessed 31 May 2015.
 
 Salt, Mary C. "List of English Embassies to France, 1272–1307 (in Notes and Documents)." The English Historical Review, 44:174. (Apr., 1929), pp. 263–278.
 Taylor, A. J. "Who was 'John Pennardd, Leader of the Men of Gwynedd'? (in Notes and Documents)." The English Historical Review, 91:358. (Jan., 1976), pp. 79–97.

1238 births
1328 deaths
Christians of Lord Edward's crusade
Otto
13th-century diplomats
Savoyards in Thirteenth Century England